Boston Road is Springfield, Massachusetts's principal commercial and retail corridor, located on the eastern edge of the city. The Boston Road neighborhood, historically known as Springfield Plain, is named for being a major waypoint on the Boston Post Road system.

Neighborhood 
Boston Road remains a commercial stronghold, home to the Eastfield Mall, various big-box stores, and a movie theater.

Springfield city parks, including Five Mile Pond and Loon Pond, provide places to swim, fish, boat, and picnic. The High School of Science & Technology and the controversially renovated Putnam Vocational High School are located in this neighborhood.

The neighborhood also features numerous local and chain restaurants and a handful of independently owned restaurants and bars.

History 
The area was sparsely settled until the 1890s.

The first Friendly's Restaurant opened on Boston Road.

References

Neighborhoods in Springfield, Massachusetts